Dirkje Johanna ("Desi") Reijers (born 4 June 1964 in Doetinchem) is a former freestyle swimmer from the Netherlands, who competed for her native country at the 1984 Summer Olympics in Los Angeles, United States.

There she won the silver medal in the 4×100 m freestyle relay, alongside Conny van Bentum, Elles Voskes, and Annemarie Verstappen, just like a year earlier at the European LC Championships in Rome, Italy. In LA she was disqualified with the 4×100 m medley relay Team.

References
 Dutch Olympic Committee

1964 births
Living people
Dutch female freestyle swimmers
Olympic swimmers of the Netherlands
Swimmers at the 1984 Summer Olympics
Medalists at the 1984 Summer Olympics
Olympic silver medalists for the Netherlands
People from Doetinchem
Sportspeople from Gelderland
Olympic silver medalists in swimming
20th-century Dutch women
20th-century Dutch people